The 52nd Assembly District of Wisconsin is one of 99 districts in the Wisconsin State Assembly. Located in east-central Wisconsin, the district comprises central Fond du Lac County, including the city of Fond du Lac and the villages of Eden and Oakfield.  The district also contains landmarks such as Marian University, the University of Wisconsin–Oshkosh, Fond du Lac Campus, Taycheedah Correctional Institution, and Fond-du-Lac Airport. The district is represented by Republican Jerry L. O'Connor, since January 2023.

The 52nd Assembly district is located within Wisconsin's 18th Senate district, along with the 53rd and 54th Assembly districts.

List of past representatives

References 

Wisconsin State Assembly districts
Fond du Lac County, Wisconsin